Isparta Atatürk Şehir Stadyumu is a multi-purpose stadium in Isparta, Turkey.  It is currently used mostly for football matches and is the home ground of Turkish Regional Amateur League team Ispartaspor.

The stadium was built in 1950 and currently holds 10,000 people.

With the promotion of Emrespor to the Turkish TFF Third League at the end of the 2011–2012 season, the stadium became their home ground.

References

External links
AmatorFutbol

Football venues in Turkey
Multi-purpose stadiums in Turkey
Buildings and structures in Isparta Province
Sports venues completed in 1950
1950 establishments in Turkey
Things named after Mustafa Kemal Atatürk